The Church of Saint John the Evangelist is a Church of England parish church in Tolpuddle, Dorset. The church is a Grade I listed building.

History
The earliest parts of the church date to the 12th century, and it was enlarged in the 13th and 14th centuries. It was restored in 1855 by the architect T. H. Wyatt.

On 26 January 1956, the church was designated a Grade I listed building.

Gallery

References

External links
 A Church Near You entry

Grade I listed churches in Dorset
Church of England church buildings in Dorset
12th-century church buildings in England